Jiří Bubla (born January 27, 1950) is a Czech former professional ice hockey defenceman.

Bubla played his entire National Hockey League career with the Vancouver Canucks, beginning in 1982. He retired after the 1985–86 season. He is the father of Jiří Šlégr, Jan Bubla and Štefan Bubla. 

He completed for Czechoslovakia at the 1976 Winter Olympics, where the teams won the silver medal, and at the 1980 Winter Olympics.

Following his retirement from ice hockey, he was arrested at the 1987 IIHF World Championship in Vienna and charged with involvement in a drug trafficking ring. Convicted of smuggling four kilograms of heroin, he served nearly four years in an Austrian jail.

Career statistics

Regular season and playoffs

International

References

External links 
 
 
 
 

1950 births
Living people
Czech ice hockey defencemen
Czechoslovak ice hockey defencemen
Olympic ice hockey players of Czechoslovakia
Olympic medalists in ice hockey
Olympic silver medalists for Czechoslovakia
Ice hockey players at the 1976 Winter Olympics
Ice hockey players at the 1980 Winter Olympics
Medalists at the 1976 Winter Olympics
Undrafted National Hockey League players
HC Litvínov players
HC Sparta Praha players
Vancouver Canucks players
Drug traffickers
Sportspeople from Ústí nad Labem
Czechoslovak expatriate sportspeople in Canada
Czech expatriate ice hockey players in Canada
Czechoslovak expatriate ice hockey people
Czech prisoners and detainees